is a railway station in Kawara, Fukuoka Prefecture, Japan. It is on the Tagawa Line, operated by the Heisei Chikuhō Railway. Trains arrive roughly every 30 minutes.

External links
Kakishita-Onsen-Guchi Station (Heisei Chikuhō Railway website)

References

Railway stations in Fukuoka Prefecture
Railway stations in Japan opened in 1993
Heisei Chikuhō Railway Tagawa Line